Museum of Outstanding Figures of Ukrainian Culture is one of the museums in Kyiv, Ukraine, dedicated to prominent Ukrainian Culture celebrities: Lesia Ukrainka, Mykola Lysenko, Panas Saksagansky, Mykhailo Starytsky.

It was founded in 1987. The reason to create this museum space was the fact that in the late 19th — early 20th centuries at this area lived the families of such Ukrainian Culture celebrities as Lesia Ukrainka, Mykola Lysenko, Panas Saksagansky and Mykhailo Starytsky.   

The memorial buildings have been preserved till now; they are natural borders of the Museum's territory. Each of this houses has an exposition depicting the life and creative activities of the celebrity.

Source 
 Museums of Kyiv. Guide-book, 2005. - P. 51

External links 
 Official Museum's website (in Ukrainian)

Literature 
 Музей видатних діячів української культури Лесі Українки, Миколи Лисенка, Панаса Саксаганського, Михайла Старицького. Ілюстроване інформаційне видання. / Головне управління культури і мистецтв виконавчого органу Київської міської ради (Київської міської державної адміністрації); [упорядник Н. Терехова та інші]. — К. : Кий, 2007. — 144 с. : ілюстрації. — 1000 примірників.

Museums in Kyiv